Euplexaura is a genus of cnidarians belonging to the family Plexauridae.

The species of this genus are found in Pacific and Indian Ocean.

Species

Species:

Euplexaura abietina 
Euplexaura albida 
Euplexaura amerea

References

Plexauridae
Octocorallia genera